(singular ,) were a social class of women, trained as entertainers, which existed in the pre-modern Islamic world. The term has been used for both non-free women and free, including some of which came from the nobility. It has been suggested that "the geisha of Japan are perhaps the most comparable form of socially institutionalized female companionship and entertainment for male patrons, although, of course, the differences are also myriad".

Historically, the  flourished under the Umayyad Caliphate, the Abbasid Caliphate, and in Al-Andalus.

Terminology

Many  were free women. One of them was even an Abbasid princess.

The meaning of  extended to include manual labourers generally, and then focused more specifically on people paid for their work, and then more specifically again . From here, its feminine form came to have the meaning of a female performer of various arts, in a specific role.

Characteristics and history

Like other slaves in the Islamicate world,  were legally sexually available to their owners. They were often associated in literature with licentiousness, and sexuality was an important part of their appeal, but they do not seem to have been prostitutes.

However, there were also common  who performed for the public in common -houses, and these houses were in some cases often brothels.

It is not clear how early the institution of the  emerged, but  certainly flourished during the ‘Abbasid period; according to Matthew S. Gordon, "it is not yet clear to what extent courtesans graced regional courts and elite households at other points of Islamic history".

Because of their social prominence,  comprise one of the most richly recorded sections of pre-modern Islamicate female society, particularly female slaves, making them important to the history of slavery in the Muslim world. For a few , it is possible to give quite a full biography. Many of these sources recount the repartee of prominent , though there are hints that  in less wealthy households were used by their owners to attract gifts. In the 'Abbasid period,  were often educated in the cities of Basra, Ta'if, and Medina.

Decline

The institution of  declined with the waning fortunes of the Abbasid Caliphate. The initial fracture of the Abbasids did not have immediate impact. The  did not take sides in political disputes. However, political instability led to fiscal mismanagement, and during the Abbasids' heyday, the finances were mismanaged. Further, the new class of Turkish soldiers demanded better pay, leading to the emptying of the treasury; the resulting austerity meant artistic activity could not be funded, and thus flourish, as it had previously. In addition, soldiers extorted money from citizens perceived as rich. This made ostentatious behavior risky.

Al-Andalus
It seems that for the first century or so in al-Andalus,  were brought west after being trained in Medina or Baghdad, or were trained by artists from the east. It seems that by the 11th century, with the collapse of the Caliphate of Córdoba,  tended to be trained in Córdoba rather than imported after training. It seems that while female singers still existed, enslaved ones were no longer found in al-Andalus in the 14th century CE.

Famous 
 Atika bint Shuhda
 'Inān (841)
 Djamila (720)
 Tawaddud (a fictional but famous character, putatively flourishing )
 Dananir al Barmakiyya (810s)
 Ulayya bint al-Mahdi, daughter of the caliph Al-Mahdi ( 825)
 Arib al-Ma'muniyya (CE 797–890)
 Shāriyah
 Farida (born )
 Faḍl al-Shā'irah (871 CE)

References

Citations

Sources

Further reading
 Hekmat Dirbas, "Naming of Slave-girls in Arabic: A Survey of Medieval and Modern Sources", Zeitschrift für Arabische Linguistik, 69 (2019), 26–38, 

Islam and slavery
Sexual slavery

Arabic-language women poets
Arabic-language poets
History of slavery
Arabian slaves and freedmen
 
Slavery in the Abbasid Caliphate